Harshad Chopda (born 17 May 1983) is an Indian actor known for his portrayal of Captain Aditya Hooda in Bepannaah and Dr. Abhimanyu Birla in Yeh Rishta Kya Kehlata Hai. He is the recipient of four Indian Television Academy Awards, one Indian Telly Award and two Asian Viewers Television Awards.

Early life
Chopda was born on 17 May 1983, in Gondia, Maharashtra. He completed his schooling from Rabindranath Tagore School, Gondia. He then graduated in computer engineering from Modern College of Engineering, Pune.

Career
Chopda started his television career in 2006 with Zee TV's Mamta where he played Karan Srivastav. From 2006 to 2007, he portrayed Cadet Ali Baig in SAB TV's Left Right Left. Next, he joined Sony TV's Amber Dhara as Akshat Mehra opposite Kashmira Irani.

From 2008 to 2010, he portrayed Prem Juneja in Star Plus's Kis Desh Mein Hai Meraa Dil opposite Additi Gupta. From 2010 to 2011, Chopda played Anurag Ganguly in Star Plus's Tere Liye opposite Anupriya Kapoor.

From 2011 to 2012, he played Mohan Gala in NDTV Imagine's Dharampatni opposite Aasiya Kazi. In 2012, Chopda portrayed Raghavendra Pratap Singh in Life OK's Dil Se Di Dua... Saubhagyavati Bhava? opposite Sriti Jha and Karanvir Bohra. From 2014 to 2015, he played Sahir Azeem Chaudhary in Sony TV's Humsafars opposite Shivya Pathania.

In 2017, Chopda made his film debut as Rahul in 2016 The End co-starring Priya Banerjee, Divyendu Sharma and Kiku Sharda.

In 2018, he portrayed Captain Aditya Hooda in Colors TV's Bepannah opposite Jennifer Winget. Bepannaah made a successful debut, entering the list of top five shows in its very first week. Times of India wrote "Harshad Chopda is a complete natural and plays his part effortlessly." India Today stated "Harshad nails his character of Aditya with some black humour and hard-hitting one-liners." In 2020, he starred in Desi Music Factory's music video Juda Kar Diya opposite Erica Fernandes.

Since October 2021, Chopda has been starring as Dr. Abhimanyu Birla in Star Plus's Yeh Rishta Kya Kehlata Hai opposite Pranali Rathod. Chopda also starred in the musical series Aakhiri Mulaqaat spanning four songs opposite Smriti Kalra.

Media image
In 2017, Chopda was listed 16th in Times of Indias Top 20 Most Desirable Men on Indian Television List. In 2018, he was placed 19th in Eastern Eyes 50 Sexiest Asian Men List. His chemistry with Jennifer Winget in Bepannah won them the title of Times of Indias Most Favourite Onscreen Jodi 2018. He was also listed 8th in Times of Indias Top 20 Most Desirable Men on Indian Television 2018.

In 2019, he was placed 6th in Eastern Eyes 50 Sexiest Asian Men List. Next, he was listed 8th in Times of Indias Top 20 Most Desirable Men on Indian Television 2019.

Filmography

Television

Films

Music videos

Awards and nominations
Chopda has received numerous nominations and awards, including four Indian Television Academy Awards, one Indian Telly Award and two Asian Viewers Television Awards.

See also 
 List of Indian television actors

References

External links

 
 

21st-century Indian male actors
Indian male soap opera actors
Indian male television actors
Living people
1983 births
Male actors from Maharashtra
People from Gondia
Place of birth missing (living people)